This is a list of the earliest known references to cricket being played in each of the historic counties of England.

Counties (by date of reference)
 Surrey – c.1550 re John Derrick and the 1597 Guildford court case; the world's earliest definite mention of cricket
 Kent – c.1611 re the match at Chevening, the world's oldest known organised match
 Sussex – 1611 re an ecclesiastical court case
 Hampshire – 1647 at Winchester College
 London – 1617 re Oliver Cromwell
 Oxfordshire – 1673 at the University of Oxford
 Middlesex – 1680; also the first mention re umpires
 Cambridgeshire – 1710 at the University of Cambridge
 Essex – 1724 re the Chingford-Stead match
 Berkshire – 1727 at Eton College
 Gloucestershire – 1729
 Buckinghamshire – 1730
 Hertfordshire – 1732
 Dorset – 1738
 Bedfordshire – 1741
 Huntingdonshire – 1741
 Northamptonshire – 1741
 Suffolk – 1743
 Norfolk – 1745
 Durham – 1751
 Somerset – 1751
 Warwickshire – 1751
 Yorkshire – 1751
 Derbyshire – 1757
 Northumberland – 1766
 Wiltshire – 1769
 Nottinghamshire – 1771
 Leicestershire – 1776
 Cheshire – 1781      
 Lancashire – 1781
 Rutland – 1790
 Lincolnshire – 1792
 Shropshire – 1794
 Devon – 1799
 Cornwall – 1813
 Staffordshire – 1817
 Herefordshire – 1823
 Westmorland – 1827
 Cumberland – 1828
 Worcestershire – 1829

Ireland, Scotland and Wales
 Glamorgan – 1780 re a match in Swansea
 Ireland – 1792 re a military match in Dublin
 Scotland – 1750 re a military match in Perth
 Wales – 1763 in Pembroke

Formation of county clubs in England and Wales
Numerous sources list the foundation dates of the county clubs. Note that some clubs have been re-founded after earlier versions became defunct. The dates below are mostly taken from the 1982 edition of Wisden Cricketers' Almanack:

 Bedfordshire – 1899
 Berkshire – 1895
 Buckinghamshire – 1891
 Cambridgeshire – 1844 to 1869; 1891
 Carmarthenshire – 1908 to 1911
 Cheshire – 1908
 Cornwall – 1894
 Cumberland (called Cumberland and Westmorland CCC until 1955) – 1948
 Denbighshire – 1930 to 1935
 Derbyshire – 1870
 Devon – 1867 to 1897; 1899
 Dorset – 1896
 Durham – 1882
 Essex – 1876
 Glamorgan – 1888
 Gloucestershire – 1871
 Hampshire – 1863
 Herefordshire – 1836 to unknown''; 1992
 Hertfordshire – 1876
 Huntingdonshire – 1831 to 1895; 1948
 Kent – 1842
 Lancashire – 1864
 Leicestershire – 1879
 Lincolnshire – 1906
 Middlesex – 1864
 Monmouthshire – 1901 to 1934
 Norfolk – 1827 to c.1850; 1876
 Northamptonshire – 1878
 Northumberland – 1895
 Nottinghamshire – 1841
 Oxfordshire – 1921
 Shropshire – 1956
 Somerset – 1875
 Staffordshire – 1871
 Suffolk – 1932
 Surrey – 1845
 Sussex – 1839
 Wales Minor Counties – 1988
 Warwickshire – 1882
 Wiltshire – 1893
 Worcestershire – 1865
 Yorkshire – 1863

References

Bibliography
 
 
 
 
 
 
 
 
 
 

English cricket lists
English cricket in the 14th to 17th centuries
English cricket in the 18th century
English cricket in the 19th century
Cricket-related lists